The Southwestern Statistical Region (Albanian: Rajoni jugperendimor) is one of eight statistical regions of North Macedonia. Southwestern, located in the west and southwestern part of the country, borders Albania to the west. Internally, it borders the Pelagonia, Polog, Skopje, and Vardar statistical regions.

Municipalities

Southwestern statistical region is divided into 9 municipalities:
Centar Župa
Debar
Debarca
Kičevo
Makedonski Brod
Ohrid
Plasnica
Struga
Vevčani

Demographics

Population
The current population of the Southwestern statistical region is 177,398 citizens, according to the last population census in 2021.

Ethnicities
The largest group in the region are Macedonians, followed by Albanians and Turks.

References

Statistical regions of North Macedonia